The Karenga is a river in Zabaykalsky Krai, southern East Siberia, Russia. The area through which the river flows is inhabited by indigenous Tungus people.  

There are Neolithic archaeological sites near the mouth of the river where ancient ceramic remains belonging to the Ust-Karenga Culture have been found.

Course
The Karenga is a right tributary of the Vitim. Its sources are in the Chingikhan Saddle, located between the Yablonoi Mountains and the Chersky Range. Kontalaksky Golets, the highest peak of the Yablonoi rises to the NW of the river valley, near Tungokochen. It flows in a mainly northeastern direction within a winding channel. The vegetation along the banks of the river is mainly sparse larch taiga. Its lower course is at the eastern end of the Vitim Plateau. Finally, at the border with Buryatia it meets the Vitim  from its mouth in the Lena. 

The river is frozen between late November and mid April. It has sharp fluctuations in the water level in the spring and summer. There is patchy distribution of permafrost in the basin.

See also
List of rivers of Russia

References

External links
Tourism in Transbaikalia. Karenga. 2011
Жители села Усть Каренга шесть месяцев в году отрезаны от цивилизации

Rivers of Zabaykalsky Krai